Victor Leclercq (1896–1945) was a Belgian painter.

1896 births
1945 deaths
People from Soignies
20th-century Belgian painters
Belgian people who died in Nazi concentration camps